"Buffalo Soldier" is a reggae song written by Bob Marley and Noel "King Sporty" Williams and recorded by Jamaican band Bob Marley and the Wailers. It did not appear on record until the 1983 posthumous release of Confrontation, when it became one of Marley's best-known songs. The title and lyrics refer to the black US cavalry regiments, known as "Buffalo Soldiers", that fought in the American Indian Wars after 1866. Marley linked their fight to a fight for survival, and recasts it as a symbol of black resistance.

Background 
The origin of the term "Buffalo Soldier" is theorized as given to black troops by Native Americans. The name was embraced by the troops, who were well acquainted with "the buffalo's fierce bravery and fighting spirit". The Buffalo Soldier's duties were settling railroad disputes, building telegraph lines, repairing and building forts, and otherwise helping settlers colonize lands taken from Native Americans. They were also tasked with protecting the colonizing settlers from Native Americans.

The song's bridge, with the lyrics woe! yoe! yo!, was rumored to be inspired by the chorus from The Banana Splits' "The Tra-La-La Song", the 1968 theme from their TV show, written by Mark Barkan and Ritchie Adams. There has been no proof of this, and an August 2008 story by the BBC seems to cast doubts on this origin story, while acknowledging that the two riffs are extremely similar, and that Marley could very well have heard the tune, as could his producer.

Reception
Cash Box said that the song's "socio-political theme, steady rhythmic stream and strong but sweet vocals re-emphasize what Marley's magic was all about."

Music video 
A music video was produced for "Buffalo Soldier" to promote the single.

Charts

Certifications

See also 
 List of anti-war songs

References 

Songs about soldiers
Songs about the military
1983 songs
Bob Marley songs
Songs written by Bob Marley
Reggae songs
1983 singles
Island Records singles
Buffalo Soldiers
Songs released posthumously